Simon Christian Hammer (19 December 1866 – 18 March 1932) was a Norwegian writer and journalist.

Life
He was born in Arendal in the county of Aust-Agder, Norway. He became editor-in-chief of Stavangeren in 1893, and later worked at Farmand, Verdens Gang and Tidens Tegn. He was also the Norwegian correspondent for The Times from 1917 to 1932. He published several history books.

Selected works

 Ludvig Holberg, the Founder of Norwegian Literature and an Oxford Student
 Kristianias historie  (1923)
 Nicolai Andreas Grevstad  (Norsk biografisk leksikon. Oslo, Norway:  1929)
 Things seen in Norway (1934)

References

External links
 
 

1866 births
1932 deaths
Norwegian non-fiction writers
Norwegian newspaper editors
Norwegian newspaper reporters and correspondents
People from Arendal